In His Steps is a 1964 Christian film based on the novel of the same name by Charles Sheldon, written and directed by Ken Anderson.

External links

1964 films
1964 drama films
Films about evangelicalism
American black-and-white films
Films based on American novels
1960s English-language films